Levophenacylmorphan is a morphinan derivative that acts as an opioid agonist. It has potent analgesic effects and is around 10x more potent than morphine. Adverse effects associated with its use are those of the opioids as a whole, including pruritus, nausea, respiratory depression, euphoria and development of tolerance and dependence to its effects.

See also
 3-Hydroxymorphinan
 Levorphanol
 Norlevorphanol
 Phenomorphan

References

Ketones
Morphinans
Mu-opioid receptor agonists
Phenols
Synthetic opioids